This local electoral calendar for the year 2010 lists the subnational elections held in 2010 in the de jure and de facto sovereign states. By-elections and sub-national referendums are also included.

January
17 January: Switzerland, Neuchâtel, Council of States by-election
24 January: Switzerland, Solothurn, Council of States by-election

February
6 February: United States, New Orleans, Mayor and City Council (1st round)

March
2 March: United States, Oklahoma City, Mayor
3 March: Netherlands, Municipal
5 March: New Zealand, Botany
6 March: United States, New Orleans, City Council (2nd round)
7 March: Switzerland
Appenzell Ausserrhoden, 
Basel-Landschaft, 
Basel-Stadt, 
Fribourg, 
Geneva, referendum
Glarus, Executive Council
Grisons, 
Jura, referendum
Lucerne, 
Nidwalden, Executive Council (1st round) and Landrat
Obwalden, Executive Council and Cantonal Council
Schaffhausen, 
Solothurn, 
St. Gallen, 
Thurgau, 
Ticino, referendum
Uri, Council of States by-election
Zug, 
Zürich City, 
14 March: Novosibirsk, Council of Deputies
28 March: Switzerland, Bern, Executive Council and 
Bernese Jura,

April
6 April: United States, Anchorage, Assembly
9 April: India, Assam, Bodoland, Territorial Council
13 April: United States, Long Beach, Mayor and City Council (1st round)
24 April: Bangladesh, Bhola-3, House of the Nation by-election
25 April: Switzerland, Appenzell Innerrhoden, Landsgemeinde

May
2 May: Switzerland
Glarus, 
Nidwalden, Executive Council (2nd round) and 
3 May: India, Tripura, Tripura Tribal Areas Autonomous District, Council
6 May: United Kingdom
8 May: United States, Arlington, City Council
9 May: 
Germany, Dortmund, Lord Mayor
Uruguay, Municipal
10 May: Philippines, Governors
18 May: United States, Portland, City Commission (1st round)
24 May: Papua New Guinea, Bougainvillean president
26 May: India, Manipur
Chandel Autonomous District, Council
Churachandpur Autonomous District, Council
Sadar Hills Autonomous District, Council
27 May: Isle of Man, Douglas East, House of Keys by-election
30 May: Glarus, Landrat

June
1 June: Egypt, Shoura
2 June: India, Manipur
Senapati Autonomous District, Council
Tamenglong Autonomous District, Council
Ukhrul Autonomous District, Council
7 June: India, Assam
Jorhat District, Thengal Kachari Autonomous Council
Kamrup District, Morigaon District and Nagaon District, Tiwa Autonomous Council
Lakhimpur District, Deori Autonomous Council
8 June:
Egypt, Shoura
United States
Fresno, City Council (1st round)
Long Beach, City Council (2nd round)
Los Angeles County, Board of Supervisors
Orange County, CA, Board of Supervisors (1st round)
Riverside County, Board of Supervisors
Sacramento, City Council
San Bernardino County, Board of Supervisors (1st round)
San Diego County, Board of Supervisors (1st round)
San Diego, City Council (1st round) and Referendums
San Francisco, Referendums
Santa Clara County, Board of Supervisors (1st round)
San Jose, Mayor and City Council (1st round)
10 June: Bangladesh, Chittagong, Mayor and City Corporation
13 June: Switzerland
Aargau, 
Appenzell Ausserrhoden, 
Basel-Landschaft, 
Basel-Stadt, 
Grisons, Executive Council and Grand Council (1st round)
Lucerne, 
Solothurn, 
Uri, 
Zürich, 
18 June: Trinidad and Tobago

July
4 July: Switzerland, Grisons, Grand Council (2nd round)
16 July: Jersey, Senatorial by-election

August
24 August: United States
Mesa, City Council
Miami-Dade County, County Commission (1st round)
29 August: Switzerland, Schaffhausen,

September
17 September: Auckland, New Zealand
18 September: United States, Honolulu, City Council (1st round)
26 September: Switzerland
Basel-Landschaft, 
Basel-Stadt, 
Bern, 
Geneva, referendums
Lucerne, 
Neuchâtel, referendum
Nidwalden, 
Obwalden, 
Schwyz, 
Solothurn, 
St. Gallen, 
Uri, 
Vaud, referendums
Zürich,

October
3 October: 
Hungary, Local elections
Switzerland, Zug, Executive Council and Cantonal Council
 Brazil, Governors (1st round) and Legislative Assemblies
16 October: India, Ladakh, Leh District, Ladakh Autonomous Hill Development Council
21, 24, 28 October, 1, 9, 20 November: India, Bihar state assembly
24 October: Switzerland, Jura, Government (1st round) and Parliament
25 October: Philippines, Local
31 October: 
Ukraine, Local
Brazil, Governors (2nd round)

November
1 November: India, Banka, House of the People by-election
2 November:
Federated States of Micronesia
Kosrae, Governor, Lieutenant Governor (1st round) and State Legislature
Yap, Governor and State Legislature
United States, Governors (36/50)
Navajo Nation, President, Board of Education, Board of Election Supervisors, Council and Referendum
Washington, D.C., Mayor and Council
Bakersfield, City Council
Bexar County, Commissioners Court
Broward County, Commission
Clark County, County Commission
Cook County, Assessor, Board of Commissioners, Board of Commissioners President, Board of Review, Clerk, Sheriff, Treasurer and Water Reclamation District Board
Dallas County, Commissioners Court
Fresno, City Council (2nd round)
Harris County, Commissioners Court
Honolulu, City Council (2nd round)
Louisville, Mayor and Metropolitan Council
Miami-Dade County, County Commission (2nd round)
Oakland, Mayor and City Council
Orange County, Board of Supervisors (2nd round)
Portland, City Commission (2nd round)
San Bernardino County, Board of Supervisors (2nd round)
San Diego County, Board of Supervisors (2nd round)
San Diego, City Council (2nd round) and Referendums
San Francisco, Board of Supervisors, Assessor-Recorder, Public Defender and Referendums
Santa Clara County, Board of Supervisors (2nd round)
San Jose, City Council (2nd round)
Tarrant County, Commissioners Court
Virginia Beach, City Council
Wayne County, Executive and Commission
7 November: Greece, Municipalities
14 November: Switzerland, Jura, Government (2nd round)
18 November: India, Mizoram, Lai Autonomous District, Council
28 November: 
Catalonia (Spain), Parliament
Switzerland, Basel-Landschaft, 
Basel-Stadt, 
Geneva, referendums
Jura, referendums
Schaffhausen, 
Ticino, referendums
Uri, 
Zug,

December
5 December: Venezuela, Regional
20 December: Jamaica, Saint Ann North Eastern, House of Representatives by-election

References

2010 elections